Randy Mario Poffo (November 15, 1952 – May 20, 2011), better known by his ring name "Macho Man" Randy Savage, was an American professional wrestler best known for his time in the World Wrestling Federation (WWF) and World Championship Wrestling (WCW).

Savage was described by sportswriter Bill Simmons as "one of the greatest pro wrestlers who ever lived"—a statement echoed by multiple industry performers. He was recognizable by wrestling fans for his distinctively flamboyant ring attire and raspy voice, intensity exhibited in and out of the ring, use of the finale from "Pomp and Circumstance March no. 1" by Elgar as his entrance music, and signature catchphrase, "Oooh yeah!" For most of his tenures in the WWF and WCW, Savage was managed by his real-life wife, Miss Elizabeth Hulette.

Savage had six world championship reigns during his 32-year career, including two as WWF World Heavyweight Champion and four as WCW World Heavyweight Champion. As WWF Champion, he held similar drawing power as Hulk Hogan. A one-time WWF Intercontinental Heavyweight Champion, he was named by WWE as the greatest titleholder of all time and credited for bringing "a higher level of credibility to the title through his amazing in-ring performances".

Savage was the 1987 WWF King of the Ring and the 1995 WCW World War 3 winner. He headlined many pay-per-view events throughout his career, including WrestleManias IV, V, and VIII (being part of a double main event at VIII), two of the first five SummerSlam shows, and 1995 Starrcade. He was inducted into the Wrestling Observer Newsletter Hall of Fame upon its inception in 1996, with a posthumous WWE Hall of Fame induction following in 2015.

Early life
Randy Poffo was born November 15, 1952, in Columbus, Ohio, the eldest son of Judy (Sverdlin) and Angelo Poffo. His father was Italian American and his mother was Jewish; Poffo was raised Catholic. Randy's father was a well-known wrestler in the 1950s and 1960, and his younger brother Lanny Poffo also went into wrestling.

The Poffo family lived in Zanesville, Ohio, where Randy attended Grover Cleveland Middle School. He graduated from Downers Grove North High School in the Chicago suburb of Downers Grove, Illinois.

Poffo later moved to Staten Island, New York, before moving to Lexington, Kentucky, where he lived for many years. He was an alumnus of Southern Illinois University–Carbondale.

Baseball career 
Savage was signed by the St. Louis Cardinals organization as a catcher out of high school. He was placed in the minor leagues to develop, where he mostly played as an outfielder in the Cardinals and Cincinnati Reds farm systems. Savage was 18 when he began playing minor league baseball; one of his teammates on the 1971 Gulf Coast League Cardinals was Larry Herndon, who was also his roommate. Savage would swing a bat into a hanging car tire to strengthen his hands and utilize his legs during swings. The technique was so effective that Herndon used it during his own career as a baseball coach. Savage injured his natural (right) throwing shoulder after a collision at home plate, and he learned to throw with his left arm instead. Savage's last season was 1974, when he played for the Class A Tampa Tarpons in the Reds organization. He played 289 games over four minor league seasons, batting .254 with 16 home runs and 129 RBI.

Professional wrestling career

Early career (19731985)

Savage first broke into the wrestling business in 1973 during the fall and winter of the baseball off season. His first wrestling character, The Spider, was similar to Spider-Man. He later took the ring name Randy Savage at the suggestion of his longtime friend and trainer Terry "The Goose" Stephens and Georgia Championship Wrestling (GCW) booker Ole Anderson, who said that the name Poffo did not fit someone who "wrestled like a savage". The "Macho Man" nickname was adopted after his mother Judy Poffo read a Reader's Digest article predicting that the phrase would become "the next hot term". Savage eventually decided to end his stalled baseball career and join his father and brother to wrestle full time. He wrestled his first match against Midwest Territory wrestler "Golden Boy" Paul Christy. Savage worked with his father and brother in Michigan, the Carolinas, Georgia, the Maritimes, and the eastern Tennessee territory run by Nick Gulas.

After a while, his father felt that his sons were not getting the pushes they deserved so he started the "outlaw" International Championship Wrestling (ICW) promotion in the mid-American states. Eventually, ICW disbanded and Randy and Lanny entered the Memphis scene, joining Jerry Lawler's Continental Wrestling Association (their former competitors). While there, Savage feuded with Lawler over the AWA Southern Heavyweight Championship. He also teamed with Lanny to battle The Rock 'n' Roll Express; this feud included a match on June 25, 1984, in Memphis, where in the storyline, Savage injured Ricky Morton by piledriving him through the timekeeper's table, leading to the Express winning by disqualification (though Savage's brother Lanny later said that Morton was not injured in the attack). Later in 1984, Savage turned babyface and allied with Lawler against Jimmy Hart's First Family alliance, only to turn heel on Lawler again in early 1985 and resume the feud with him over the title. This ended when Lawler beat Savage in a Loser Leaves Town match on June 7 in Memphis, Tennessee.

World Wrestling Federation (1985–1994)

Intercontinental Heavyweight Champion (1985–1987) 
In June 1985, Savage signed with Vince McMahon. Billed as "the top free agent in pro wrestling", Savage's first appearances on Tuesday Night Titans featured several established managers (including Bobby “The Brain” Heenan, Jimmy Hart, Mr. Fuji, Johnny Valiant, and "Classy" Freddie Blassie) offering their services to Savage. He eventually declined their offers and chose Miss Elizabeth as his new manager. His gimmick was a crazed, ego-maniacal bully who mistreated Miss Elizabeth and threatened anyone who even looked at her. He made his pay-per-view (PPV) debut at The Wrestling Classic on November 7, 1985, participating in a 16-man tournament. He defeated Ivan Putski, Ricky "The Dragon" Steamboat, and the Dynamite Kid before losing by a countout in the finals to Junkyard Dog.

In late 1985, Savage started a feud with then Intercontinental Heavyweight Champion Tito Santana over that title. Santana beat him on October 19, 1985, at San Juan, Puerto Rico. During November 2, 1985 episode of Saturday Night's Main Event III, he unsuccessfully challenged Santana for the title (Savage won the match by countout, but not the title because the title did not change hands by countout). In a rematch on WWF on NESN on February 8, 1986, he won the WWF Intercontinental Heavyweight Championship at the Boston Garden by using an illegal steel object stashed in his tights to knock out Santana. Early in his WWF career, Savage also won three countout victories (the first at the Spectrum in Philadelphia and the other two at Madison Square Garden) over his future tag team partner WWF World Heavyweight Champion Hulk Hogan (although the belt did not change hands due to the countout) as well as engaging in feuds with Bruno Sammartino and George "The Animal" Steele. During this time, Savage also formed a tag-team with semi-retired wrestler come color commentator Jesse "The Body" Ventura, who would remain a vocal supporter of Savage until Ventura left the WWF in mid-1990, except during Savage's period as a face.

Savage's feud with Steele began on January 4, 1986 Saturday Night's Main Event IV, when Steele developed a crush on Miss Elizabeth. At WrestleMania 2, Savage defeated Steele in a match to retain his Intercontinental Heavyweight Title. He resumed his feud with Steele in early 1987, culminating in two Intercontinental Heavyweight title matches, both won by Savage.

Savage wrestled Ricky Steamboat at WrestleMania III in the Pontiac Silverdome. After 19 two-counts, Steamboat pinned Savage (with help from George Steele, who pushed Savage from the top rope seconds before he was pinned) to end his near 14-month reign as Intercontinental Heavyweight Champion. The match was extremely choreographed, as opposed to the "on the fly" nature of most wrestling matches at the time. Savage was a stickler for detail, and he and Steamboat laid out and rehearsed every spot in the match prior to WrestleMania, at his home in Florida. The match was named 1987's Match of the Year by both Pro Wrestling Illustrated and the Wrestling Observer. Steamboat and Savage were seen cheering with and hugging other wrestlers after the match. During this part of his career he became known for his stage costumes, which were created by Florida designer Michael Braun.

WWF Champion (1988–1989) 

Savage won the King of the Ring tournament later in 1987. Savage's popularity was rising to the point that he was being cheered by a majority of the fans despite being a heel, so he became less hostile towards the fans and Miss Elizabeth. When The Honky Tonk Man declared himself "the greatest Intercontinental Heavyweight Champion of all time", Savage began a feud with him to get the title back, becoming a fan favorite in the process. To help gain credibility with fans as a face prior to his match against Honky, Savage was booked (on the winning end) against heels, including Hercules, "King" Harley Race and Killer Khan, among others. On the October 3, 1987 Saturday Night's Main Event XII, he got his shot at The Honky Tonk Man and the Intercontinental Heavyweight Championship, but lost out on the title when The Hart Foundation (Bret "Hitman" Hart and Jim "The Anvil" Neidhart), who along with Honky were managed by "The Mouth of the South" Jimmy Hart, interrupted the match, getting Honky disqualified. In the ensuing beatdown, Miss Elizabeth ran back to the locker room and brought Hulk Hogan out to the ring to save Savage, leading to the formation of "The Mega Powers". Savage would lead a team of five against Honky's team of five at the first annual Survivor Series where Savage's team was victorious, avenging Elizabeth's honor. His feud with Honky continued into early 1988, where in their last high-profile matchup (aired as the undercard to Andre the Giant vs. Hulk Hogan on the February 5, 1988 The Main Event I), Savage defeated Honky by count-out after he shoved Honky away from Elizabeth and into the ring post. Their feud was blown off on March 5, at the Boston Garden weeks before WrestleMania IV when the two competed in tag team-style steel cage match, with Savage and Honky each enlisting their allies for their respective teams; the Savage-led teams usually won these matches. Although Savage did not regain the Intercontinental Championship, bigger things were awaiting him.

At WrestleMania IV, he participated in the 14-man tournament for the vacant WWF World Heavyweight Championship. During the tournament held at the Boardwalk Hall in Atlantic City, Savage defeated "The Natural" Butch Reed, Greg "The Hammer" Valentine and the One Man Gang on his way to the finals. In the final he defeated "The Million Dollar Man" Ted DiBiase (who had his bodyguard Virgil and André the Giant in his corner), by pinning him with the help of Hogan. Savage retained the WWF World Heavyweight Title for a little over a year, defending it against the likes of super heavyweights One Man Gang, the Big Boss Man and André the Giant.

The Mega Powers' first feud was against The Mega Bucks (Ted DiBiase and André the Giant), whom they defeated in the main event of the first-ever SummerSlam pay-per-view event. The match, refereed by Jesse Ventura, was famous for Miss Elizabeth jumping up on the apron of the ring late in the match and removing her skirt to show red panties. This allowed both Savage and Hogan (who had been knocked to the outside) to get back in the ring and get the pin on DiBiase with Savage pushing a reluctant Ventura to the 3-count. The Mega Powers then began feuding with The Twin Towers (Big Boss Man and Akeem who was formerly the One Man Gang). In the case of the latter feud, Savage frequently became involved in Hogan's matches involving one of the two villains (and vice versa); the two rival factions captained opposing teams in the main event of the 1988 Survivor Series, which was won by the Mega Powers.

Problems between Savage and Hogan developed, however, in early 1989 after Hogan also took Elizabeth as his manager. At the Royal Rumble, Hogan accidentally eliminated Savage from the Royal Rumble match and they started to fight until Elizabeth separated them. On The Main Event II, Savage and Hogan took on the Twin Towers in a match that saw Elizabeth accidentally get injured at ringside. Hogan carried her to the back, which enraged Savage to the point that he abandoned Hogan later in the match. Savage and Hogan got into a heated argument with Savage declaring that Hogan was an inferior wrestler to him and that he wanted to steal Elizabeth from him. He then proceeded to attack his partner, then attacked Hogan's friend Brutus "The Barber" Beefcake as he tried to intervene before finally being separated by security, thus Savage turned heel once again for the first time since 1987.

At WrestleMania V (which like WM4 was held at the Boardwalk Hall in Atlantic City), Savage dropped the WWF World Heavyweight Championship to Hogan after a reign of 371 days. Prior to the match Savage had actually been hospitalized with an infected elbow but checked himself out of hospital in order to wrestle Hogan and despite wearing a heavy bandage over the elbow and being sick as a result of the infection, still managed to put on a high quality showing. In April 1989, he replaced Elizabeth (who stayed with Hogan) as his manager with former WWF Women's Champion Sensational Sherri. Savage would co-main event SummerSlam, teaming with "The Human Wrecking Machine" Zeus (actor Tiny Lister in character as his role from Hulk Hogan's movie, No Holds Barred), against The Mega-Maniacs (Hogan and Brutus Beefcake), with the Mega-Maniacs winning after Hogan hit Zeus with Sherri's loaded purse to get the win. Savage and Zeus faced Hogan and Beefcake in a rematch contested in a steel cage at No Holds Barred and lost again.

Macho King and retirement (1989–1991) 
Savage adopted the moniker "The Macho King" after defeating Jim Duggan for the King of the Ring title in September 1989 (Duggan in turn had won it from Haku). On a later wrestling episode, he had a coronation as the new "King of the WWF" led by wrestler The Genius (actually Savage's brother, Lanny Poffo), in which Ted DiBiase gave him a scepter as a gift. Savage would use that scepter as a weapon numerous times. The "Macho King" and Hulk Hogan met one last time (intended to end their ongoing year-long feud), when Savage got a shot at Hogan's WWF World Heavyweight Championship on The Main Event III. The pinfall was counted by new heavyweight boxing champion Buster Douglas despite Savage kicking out at two, Douglas then punched Savage in the face after Savage confronted and then slapped Douglas.

Savage then began feuding with the "Common Man" Dusty Rhodes, losing a mixed tag match (along with Sherri) to Rhodes and Sapphire at WrestleMania VI but beating him in a singles match at SummerSlam. In late 1990, Savage started a feud with then-WWF Champion The Ultimate Warrior. The feud escalated at Royal Rumble, when Warrior refused to promise Savage the right to challenge him for the title, should Warrior defend it successfully against Sgt. Slaughter (Slaughter had already granted Savage this opportunity, should he beat Warrior). Savage had sent Sensational Queen Sherri out before the match to try to persuade the Warrior to promise this in a face-to-face interview laced with sexual innuendos but was unsuccessful. Outraged, Savage promised revenge, which he got during the Slaughter-Warrior title match. During the match, Sherri distracted The Warrior who chased her back to the locker room. However, halfway down the aisle "The Macho King" Randy Savage attacked the champion, resulting in the Ultimate Warrior having to crawl to the ring. Later, Savage ran out to the ring and smashed the sceptre over Warrior's head, (knocking him unconscious for Slaughter to pin), and then immediately sprinted back to the locker room. Later in the program, Savage failed to appear in the Royal Rumble which led to speculation that he and Sherri had fled the building in order to avoid The Warrior. The events at the Royal Rumble led to a career-ending match at WrestleMania VII, which Savage lost. After the match, Savage was attacked by Sherri as he lay dejected in the ring. This was too much for Miss Elizabeth, who happened to be in the audience. Elizabeth rushed to Savage's aid, fighting off Sherri and reuniting with her one-time love to huge crowd appreciation, with Savage becoming a fan favorite once again for the first time since 1989. Despite his retirement from active wrestling, Savage stayed in the WWF in a non-wrestling capacity while The Ultimate Warrior was fired by Vince McMahon after SummerSlam 1991 later that year. Savage wrestled a number of times following WrestleMania VII and the WWF's official story was that out of respect, Warrior generously allowed him to see out the final months of his contract before he was forced to retire. His last match was on April 1 in Kobe, Japan at a joint card between the WWF and Super World Sports, where he was defeated by 
Genichiro Tenryu.

Color commentator, reinstatement and departure (1991–1994) 

Savage returned to television in a non-wrestling role as the "Macho Man" after WrestleMania VII as a broadcaster. Although in storyline he was retired, Savage continued to wrestle on joint WWF/SWS cards in Japan. He also made an initial, untelevised return to the ring on July 30 in Portland, Maine at a WWF Wrestling Challenge taping when he substituted for The Ultimate Warrior and pinned The Undertaker. Following this Savage subbed for Warrior on house shows in early August against Undertaker. Savage also participated as a special referee in several house show matches between Hulk Hogan and Sgt. Slaughter.

Meanwhile, the storyline with Miss Elizabeth continued, culminating with Savage proposing to her in the ring leading to an on-air wedding at SummerSlam dubbed The Match Made in Heaven. It was at this time that Savage was targeted by Jake "The Snake" Roberts, who was by now a villain. On an episode of Prime Time Wrestling prior to SummerSlam, the announcers and several wrestlers threw a "bachelor party" for Savage, with Roberts' arrival deemed unwelcome by the rest of the contingent.

In the post-SummerSlam wedding reception, Roberts and his new ally, The Undertaker, made their presence known by hiding a live snake in one of the newly married couple's wedding presents; Elizabeth was frightened when she opened the gift box, and the Undertaker blindsided Savage by knocking him out with the urn while Roberts pulled the snake from the box and menaced Elizabeth with it. Sid Justice ran off both Roberts and The Undertaker. Savage, still unable to compete due to his WrestleMania VII loss to The Ultimate Warrior, immediately began a public campaign to have himself reinstated as an active wrestler to gain revenge on Roberts; however, WWF President Jack Tunney refused. Meanwhile, Roberts cut a series of promos berating Savage. The feud began to boil over during a television taping for WWF Superstars of Wrestling November 23 in Fort Wayne, Indiana, when Roberts cut an in-ring promo to goad Savage – who was providing television commentary – into the ring. After he was lured into the ring, Roberts attacked Savage, eventually tying Savage into the ropes before getting a live king cobra to bite his arm. According to Hulk Hogan and Jake Roberts on the Pick Your Poison DVD. the snake was holding on with the fangs and Jake had a hard time getting the snake off Randy. Sid Justice was originally supposed to be the victim of the snake bite, but due to a biceps injury, Savage accepted to be snake bitten.

Savage urged fans to lobby Tunney to reinstate him, under the rallying cry "Reinstatement! That's the plan! Reinstate the Macho Man!"  In response, Tunney reinstated Savage and announced a match between him and Roberts for the This Tuesday in Texas pay-per-view event. Savage won the match however, Roberts would perform the DDT on Savage 3 times after the match and things came to a head when Roberts slapped Miss Elizabeth. The feud continued throughout the winter, ending after a match on the February 8, 1992 Saturday Night's Main Event XXX, which Savage won; Roberts had planned a backstage ambush of Savage and Elizabeth after losing the match, but was stopped by The Undertaker.

Savage then began an on-screen feud with WWF Champion Ric Flair. According to the storyline, Flair claimed that he had been in a prior relationship with Savage's wife Miss Elizabeth, going as far as presenting pictures of Elizabeth and Flair together. This culminated in a title match at WrestleMania VIII; Savage won the match and his second WWF Championship.

During this time, Savage and Elizabeth separated in real life, and Elizabeth made her final WWF appearance on April 19, 1992, at the UK Rampage pay-per-view, where Savage defended the WWF Championship against Shawn Michaels. However, the Savage-Flair feud continued, keeping the Flair-Elizabeth television storyline intact until Elizabeth's final WWF appearance (the UK Rampage match between Savage and Michaels) aired on WWF Prime Time Wrestling in June. About this same time, WWF Magazine published photos of Savage and Elizabeth, which were identical to those featuring Elizabeth and Flair; it was revealed that Flair had doctored the Savage-Elizabeth pictures. The former couple were divorced on September 18, 1992. A statement announcing the divorce appeared in WWF Magazine at about the same time, a rare break of kayfabe for the WWF at the time. The divorce was never referenced again nor did it figure into Savage's future feuds for the duration of his WWF run.

For the better part of 1992, Savage and his old nemesis The Ultimate Warrior (who returned to the WWF at WrestleMania VIII) peacefully co-existed. However, when it was announced that Warrior was the new number-one contender for Savage's WWF Championship, old tensions resurfaced and they had several heated exchanges prior to the match. Savage defended the title against The Ultimate Warrior at SummerSlam; Savage lost the match by countout, after having his knee injured by Flair and Mr. Perfect, but retained the championship. After the match, Warrior helped a badly injured Savage to the back. On the September 14 episode of Prime Time Wrestling (taped September 1), Savage lost the WWF Championship to Flair after interference from Razor Ramon.

He formed a tag team with The Ultimate Warrior known as the "Ultimate Maniacs" after both men were attacked by Flair and Mr. Perfect during their match at SummerSlam. After his title loss shortly after, an injured Savage backed Warrior to dethrone Flair. On the November 8, 1992 Saturday Night's Main Event XXXI, they took on Money Inc. (Ted DiBiase and Irwin R. Schyster) for the WWF Tag Team Championship. Money. Inc. lost by countout but retained their title. Savage and Warrior were to face Flair and Ramon in a tag team match at Survivor Series. Warrior was fired from the WWF weeks before the event, so Savage chose Mr. Perfect, executive consultant to Flair, as his partner to replace Warrior. Perfect initially laughed off the suggestion, but was angered by Bobby Heenan and his insinuations that he could never again wrestle at his previous level, and accepted the match. Despite initial distrust (an interview prior to the match had Savage admit to Perfect that he neither liked nor trusted him), the duo defeated Flair and Ramon via a disqualification.

When Monday Night Raw began in January 1993, Savage served primarily as a color commentator, wrestling only occasionally against characters such as Doink the Clown, Repo Man, Rick Martel, and Crush. However, he was the runner up in the Royal Rumble match at Royal Rumble, where he was eliminated by Yokozuna. Savage returned to pay-per-view at Survivor Series as a substitute for Mr. Perfect. He competed in the 1994 Royal Rumble match. His last WWF pay-per-view appearance as a competitor was a victory over Crush in a Falls Count Anywhere match at WrestleMania X. Savage also made periodic appearances in Jim Cornette's Smoky Mountain Wrestling promotion in May 1994. Meanwhile, Savage was also a color commentator for the 1994 King of the Ring and made his final WWF pay-per-view appearance at SummerSlam at the new United Center in Chicago, where he served as the master of ceremonies. Before the SummerSlam PPV, Savage and several WWF superstars, including Shawn Michaels, Diesel, Razor Ramon, Bart Gunn, and the 1-2-3 Kid took part in a charity softball match against the "Chicago Media All-Stars". The WWF superstars won the game 9–7, with Savage showcasing his old baseball skills by hitting a home run. His last match in WWF was teaming with Bret Hart to defeat Owen Hart and Jim Neidhart in Rostock, Germany on September 13.

At the end of October 1994, Savage's WWF contract expired and he left to sign with rival World Championship Wrestling (WCW). He made his final televised WWF appearance on the October 31 Raw, making a save for Lex Luger against Bob Backlund. The following week, on the November 7 episode of Raw, Vince McMahon announced that Savage had left the company, thanking him for his contributions and wishing him the best of luck in the future.

World Championship Wrestling (1994–2000)

The Mega Powers reunion (1994–1995) 
Savage made his first appearance for WCW on the December 3, 1994 episode of Saturday Night. Savage made reference to the love/hate relationship he had with Hulk Hogan and stated his desire to be the WCW World Heavyweight Champion. Savage appeared at Starrcade later that month, saving Hogan from an attack by The Three Faces of Fear, shaking hands with his friend and rival. At SuperBrawl V, he teamed up with Sting and took on Avalanche and Big Bubba Rogers in a tag team match, which Sting and Savage won. The following month at Uncensored, Savage wrestled Avalanche with Savage getting the win by disqualification when a fan, who happened to be Ric Flair dressed in drag, attacked Savage. This led to a feud between Savage and Flair where Flair attacked Savage's father, Angelo Poffo, at Slamboree following a tag-team main event where Savage and Hogan defeated Flair and Vader.

Savage participated in the WCW United States Heavyweight Championship tournament and defeated The Butcher in the first round and "Stunning" Steve Austin in the quarterfinals. He then interfered in Flair's match against Alex Wright, attacking Flair and causing Wright to get disqualified, which set up a tournament semi-final in which the winner would face the winner of the Sting and Meng match for the title at The Great American Bash. Savage and Flair's tournament semi-final match never took place, however, due to Savage and Flair brawling in the backstage area prior to the match and both being eliminated from the tournament. Savage and Flair would wrestle at the pay-per-view event on Father's Day. Savage brought out his father with him, but at the end of the match, Flair used Poffo's cane to defeat Savage. In a rematch the next month, Savage defeated Flair in a lifeguard lumberjack match at Bash at the Beach. Later that year, during part of the storyline in which Arn Anderson and Ric Flair turned on each other, Flair (looking for a partner to take on Anderson and Brian Pillman in a tag match) tried to recruit Savage to be his partner. Remembering the rivalry (and how Flair had attacked Savage's father), Savage refused.

WCW World Heavyweight Champion (1995–1996) 
At World War 3, Savage won his first WCW World Heavyweight Championship by winning the first-ever 60-man three-ring battle royal. He lost the title to Flair a month later at Starrcade 1995: World Cup of Wrestling; earlier that night, he defeated Hiroyoshi Tenzan. Savage won his second WCW World Heavyweight Championship back from Flair on the January 22, 1996 episode of Nitro, but again lost the title to Flair the next month in a steel cage match at SuperBrawl VI.

In January 1996, Savage brought Elizabeth with him into WCW as his manager once again, but she turned on Savage in his last title loss to Flair. Thereafter, Flair claimed that Elizabeth had given him a sizable amount of Savage's money, taken in their divorce settlement, which Flair used to set up a "VIP section" at Monday Nitro events. Flair and Savage continued to feud until June 1996, when the overall landscape of WCW changed. At Bash at the Beach, the New World Order (nWo) was formed when Hulk Hogan turned on Savage, Sting, and Lex Luger and joined "The Outsiders", a tag team of former WWF wrestlers Kevin Nash and Scott Hall. After their inception, one of their main enemies became Savage himself, who was one of the leaders of the WCW crusaders against the nWo. Savage threatened Hogan for months, often being attacked by the nWo. At Halloween Havoc, Savage finally faced Hogan for the WCW World Heavyweight Championship, but lost when The Giant interfered and hit him with a chokeslam. Savage left WCW following the event, as he was unable to reach a new deal with the company.

New World Order (1997–1998) 

Savage returned to WCW on the January 20, 1997 episode of Nitro hijacking the show, claiming to have been "blackballed" and refusing to leave the ring until Sting showed up, and the two left together. Savage appeared again with Sting over the next couple Nitro shows roving and watching events from the crowd as "free agents". At one point, WCW president and nWo member Eric Bischoff informed Savage that his WCW career was over and he could only return as an nWo member. Sting and Savage appeared at SuperBrawl VII, where Savage left Sting's side and joined the nWo by helping Hogan defeat Roddy Piper. The next night, he reunited with Elizabeth, who had joined the nWo several months earlier during Savage's hiatus from WCW. Savage began feuding with Diamond Dallas Page and his wife Kimberly. Their feud lasted almost eight months which included tag team matches, a no disqualification match at Spring Stampede, a falls count anywhere match at The Great American Bash, and a Las Vegas Death match at Halloween Havoc.

In early 1998, Savage started a feud with Lex Luger which culminated in a match at Souled Out, which Luger won. Luger also won a rematch between the two at SuperBrawl VIII. When Hogan failed to recapture his "nWo" title from Sting, it was Savage's turn, and he got his shot at Spring Stampede. Hogan tried to make sure that Savage would not win the title because Hogan felt that he was the only nWo member who should be WCW World Heavyweight Champion, since he was the leader of the stable. With the help of Nash, however, Savage beat Sting for his third WCW World Heavyweight Championship, despite tearing his ACL in his knee during the match. The following night on Nitro, Hogan faced Savage for the championship and it looked like Hogan had Savage beat, but for the second consecutive night, Nash came to Savage's aid, powerbombing Hogan. However, an interfering Bret Hart attacked Savage and preserved the victory for Hogan. Savage then joined with Nash and others to form the nWo Wolfpac, a split from Hogan's group. Savage went on to feud with both Hart and Roddy Piper. On June 14 at The Great American Bash, Savage teamed up with Piper against and lost to Hogan and Hart by submission. After the match, Savage wrestled Piper in the next match, which Savage quickly lost to Piper by submission.

After the June 15 episode of Nitro, Savage took a hiatus from the company to recover from at least two major knee surgeries. He made only one more appearance in 1998, helping Ric Flair defeat Eric Bischoff for the Presidency of WCW on the December 28 episode of Monday Nitro. As nWo member the Giant was interfering on Bischoff's behalf, Savage entered the ring wearing an nWo shirt but duped, low-blowed and clotheslined the Giant out of the ring and removed the shirt while exiting.

Team Madness (1999–2000) 

Savage returned in April 1999, debuting a new look and theme music, sporting a slicked-back ponytail, earrings, and a new villainous attitude (though still embracing the fans), as well as introducing his new valet, Gorgeous George. His first action was as the guest referee in the main event at Spring Stampede, which was won by Diamond Dallas Page. For a short time afterward, Savage interfered in DDP's matches to make sure that Page kept the WCW World Heavyweight Championship, but when Kevin Nash won it at Slamboree, Savage went after the title himself. It was around that time that Madusa and Miss Madness joined Savage as his other two valets; together they were known as Team Madness.

At The Great American Bash, Sid Vicious returned to WCW and helped Savage to attack Kevin Nash. This led to a tag team match at Bash at the Beach between Nash and Sting against Savage and Sid Vicious, in which whoever scored the winning fall would win the WCW World Heavyweight Championship; Savage won his fourth and final WCW World Heavyweight Championship when he pinned Nash. Savage's last reign as champion did not last long, as he lost the title to a returning Hollywood Hogan the next night on Nitro, when Nash interfered and hit a powerbomb on Savage (in a reversal of the situation from the previous year, in which Nash had attacked Hogan to help Savage keep his title, albeit unsuccessfully). Team Madness slowly started to disband, after Madusa and Miss Madness began fighting each other over who was responsible for Savage's title loss. Savage soon fired both of them and started a feud with Dennis Rodman, defeating him at Road Wild.

Savage disappeared from WCW programming following his feud with Rodman and would make two more appearances: first on the October 25, 1999 episode of Nitro, when he appeared in the ring with Gorgeous George and talked about passing the torch forward. His second, and final, WCW appearance would be on the May 3, 2000, episode of Thunder, when Savage returned to join The Millionaire's Club – a group consisting of Hulk Hogan, Ric Flair, and other veterans – aiding them at the end of a 41-man battle royal. Despite Savage ending the show claiming he was going to help the veteran group take out young New Blood group, he did not appear again in WCW before they folded the next year.

Total Nonstop Action Wrestling (2004) 
Savage returned to professional wrestling at Total Nonstop Action Wrestling's (TNA) Victory Road by confronting Jeff Jarrett. He made his Impact! debut on November 19, confronting The Kings of Wrestling (Jarrett, Kevin Nash and Scott Hall). At the end of the next week's show, he led a group attack on them. On December 5, at Turning Point, he, Jeff Hardy and A.J. Styles defeated them in his last match.

Savage left TNA on December 8, disagreeing with the finish of a proposed Final Resolution main event for Jarrett's NWA World Heavyweight Championship.

Other media

Endorsements 
He was the celebrity spokesman for Slim Jim snack foods in the mid-to-late 1990s. His catch phrase in the ads was "Snap into a Slim Jim, oooooh yeah!", which became a recurring theme for Slim Jim ads. In 1998, Savage accepted an award from Harvard University's humor society Harvard Lampoon as Man of the Year.

Acting career 
Savage appeared in many television shows in the mid-to-late '90s. He appeared on a wrestling-themed episode of Baywatch that aired in 1996 with fellow WCW wrestlers Hulk Hogan, Ric Flair, Big Van Vader, and Kevin Sullivan. In 1999, he appeared on popular television shows Walker, Texas Ranger and Mad About You.

Savage appeared in his first theatrical film in 2000 making an appearance as his Macho Man character in the movie Ready to Rumble where David Arquette daydreams a sequence fighting Savage at a gas station. Savage's most famous film role was in the 2002 film Spider-Man as the wrestler Bonesaw McGraw (based on the comics character Crusher Hogan).

Savage's memorable voice gave him voice acting roles for various television and film projects. He voiced the rogue alien wrestler "Rasslor" in the Dexter's Laboratory shorts Dial M for Monkey. He also provided his voice in many other shows including the voice for "Gorilla" in an episode of King of the Hill and the voice of Space Ghost's grandfather in an episode of Space Ghost Coast To Coast. Savage served as the voice of "The Thug", in Disney's Academy Award-nominated 2008 animated film Bolt, which was his last theatrical film appearance. Savage reprised the role in Super Rhino in 2009 for the short film featuring the cast of Bolt.

Filmography

Music 
Savage's music debut was on the WWF-produced WrestleMania: The Album in 1993, where he sang on the song "Speaking from the Heart", one of many songs sung by then-WWF wrestlers on the CD.

On October 7, 2003, Savage released his debut rap album titled Be a Man. It includes a tribute song to "Mr. Perfect" Curt Hennig, as well as a diss track aimed at Hulk Hogan. Savage promoted Be a Man with a concert tour featuring Brian Adams as his bodyguard and Ron Harris as touring manager. During this time, the development of a second album was already in progress with Savage exclaiming, "We are absolutely going to have more records." However, no further albums were released.

Just three months before his death on February 2, 2011, EpicLLOYD and Nice Peter made a song along with a video for Epic Rap Battles of History of Hulk Hogan, "Macho Man" Randy Savage and Kim Jong-Il having a rap battle. They noted his death with annotations in the video.

Rapper Don Trip released a mixtape on January 24, 2014, entitled Randy Savage. All tracks have Savage's famous "Ohhh Yeah!!!" in the opening of the song; the track entitled "Cream of the Crop" has Savage's "Nothing Means Nothing" speech from an interview after WrestleMania III. In January 2015, DJ/rapper DJ Cummerbund began releasing a series of remixes that feature samples from Be a Man which has received critical acclaim.

Video games 
Savage appeared in WWF WrestleMania, WWF WrestleMania Challenge, WWF Superstars, WWF WrestleMania: Steel Cage Challenge, WWF Super WrestleMania, WWF Royal Rumble, WWF King of the Ring, WCW vs nWo: World Tour, WCW Nitro, WCW/nWo Revenge, WCW/nWo Thunder, WCW Mayhem, WWE All Stars, as a DLC in WWE 12 and as an unlockable character in WWE 2K14. He appears as the Macho King as a DLC in WWE 2K15, in WWE 2K16 as a starting wrestler, in WWE 2K17, WWE 2K18 and as an unlockable wrestler through the in-game currency "VC" (Virtual Currency), and WWE 2K19 as an exclusive DLC character for the Collector's edition of the game, entitled the "Wooooo!" Edition, WWE 2K20 as an unlockable character through the game's currency, WWE 2K Battlegrounds as a post-launch DLC character, and is also an unlockable character in the newest release WWE 2K22.

Savage's 16 plus year absence from WWE-licensed games from 1994's WWF Raw to 2011's WWE All Stars was recognized by Guinness World Records in its 2015 gamer's edition as the longest such absence.

Personal life 
Savage married Elizabeth Hulette, better known as Miss Elizabeth, in 1984. They divorced in 1992. In May 2010, Savage married Barbara Lynn Payne, who was described as his "high school sweetheart" by Terry Funk.

For years, Savage and Hulk Hogan were at odds and had an on again/off again friendship. According to Hogan, Jimmy Hart, and Savage's brother Lanny, the two reconciled shortly before his death.

Death 
On the morning of May 20, 2011, Savage was driving his Jeep Wrangler near his home in Seminole, Florida with his wife in the passenger seat when he became unresponsive and crashed into a tree. Paramedics arrived soon after and found him dead at the scene, age 58. Though initial reports of Savage's death indicated that he had been killed in the collision, he and his wife had been wearing seatbelts and suffered only minor physical injuries in the crash. An autopsy performed by the medical examiner's office found that he had an enlarged heart and advanced coronary artery disease (more than 90% narrowed) which had resulted in a sudden heart attack. The drugs found in his system included a prescription painkiller and a small amount of alcohol. Savage had never been treated for heart problems and there was no evidence that he was aware of his heart condition. The cause of death was officially ruled as atherosclerotic heart disease.

Savage was cremated, and his ashes were placed under a favorite tree on his property in Largo, Florida, near his mother's development. Ten days before his death, he had asked his brother to pour the ashes of his dog in the same spot. When Savage's brother asked why, Savage stated that it was because he wanted him to remember that spot, since he wanted his ashes to be poured there as well.

Tributes and legacy

Vince McMahon, with whom Savage had a longtime strained relationship, paid tribute to Savage in a Time magazine article, describing Savage as "one of wrestling's all-time greats." TNA held a ten bell salute in Savage's honor the night of his death. WWE aired a tribute video on the May 23 episode of Raw. Later that night, CM Punk paid tribute to Savage by wearing pink trunks and yellow boots complete with white stars on the trunks during a tag team match with R-Truth against John Cena and Rey Mysterio. Punk later adapted a version of the diving elbow drop into his moveset.

In 2011, pro wrestling podcaster Peter Rosenberg stated, to agreement from veteran wrestler Shawn Michaels, that, "You add up all the things that he was capable of, and you can make a case that there was no one better than 'Macho Man'." Also that year, Kevin Eck of The Baltimore Sun lauded Savage as an all-round performer, saying that "nobody blended power, speed, agility, and technical skills like the 'Macho Man' in his prime".

WWE released a DVD documentary, Macho Man: The Randy Savage Story, in November 2014. Despite a strained relationship over the years with the WWE, the documentary featured interviews with Savage's brother, Lanny Poffo and his mother, with Poffo giving insight to many of the rumors and denying some of the negative things other wrestlers said in the documentary about Savage, including his relationship with Elizabeth. Savage was never inducted into the WWE Hall of Fame during his lifetime and he was frequently described as being one of its most noticeably absent figures.

On January 12, 2015, WWE announced Savage as the first inductee to the WWE Hall of Fame class of 2015, and that his Mega Powers partner and long-time rival Hulk Hogan would induct him. Savage's brother, Lanny Poffo, appeared on the WWE Network that same night and commented on Savage's induction announcement by saying "I had no thoughts. I was so excited. Intellectually, there was nothing. It was all emotional. I was happy for the fans. They waited for Bruno Sammartino for so many years and now they waited for Macho Man." He went on to say that Savage's mother and his 30-year-old daughter are both very excited and said of the WWE Network, "Randy will never die."

On September 1, 2018, at the event All In, Jay Lethal was accompanied to the ring by Lanny Poffo while dressed in one of Savage's original outfits that he had been given to use by Doctor Marty Urban.

Savage is a subject of  "The Match Made in Heaven", the first episode of Viceland's Dark Side of the Ring, that premiered on April 10, 2019.

Championships and accomplishments 
 NWA Mid-America / Continental Wrestling Association
 AWA Southern Heavyweight Championship (2 times)
 CWA International Heavyweight Championship (1 time)
 NWA Mid-America Heavyweight Championship (3 times)
 Grand Prix Wrestling
 GPW International Heavyweight Championship (2 times)
 Gulf Coast Championship Wrestling
 NWA Gulf Coast Tag Team Championship (1 time) – with Lanny Poffo
 International Championship Wrestling
 ICW World Heavyweight Championship (3 times)
 Ilio DiPaolo Legends of the Aud 
Hall of Fame (2016)
 Pro Wrestling Illustrated
 Comeback of the Year (1995)
 Feud of the Year (1997) 
 Match of the Year (1987) 
 Most Hated Wrestler of the Year (1989)
 Most Popular Wrestler of the Year (1988)
 Stanley Weston Award (2011)
 Wrestler of the Year (1988)
 Ranked No. 2 of the top 500 singles wrestlers in the PWI 500 in 1992
 Ranked No. 9 of the top 500 singles wrestlers of the "PWI Years" in 2003
 Ranked No. 57 of the top 100 tag teams of the "PWI Years" with Hulk Hogan in 2003
 Professional Wrestling Hall of Fame
 Class of 2009
 United States Wrestling Association
 USWA Unified World Heavyweight Championship (1 time)
 World Championship Wrestling
 WCW World Heavyweight Championship (4 times)
 World War 3 (1995)
 World Cup Of Wrestling (1995) - with Sting, Lex Luger, Johnny B. Badd, Eddie Guerrero, Chris Benoit, and Alex Wright
 World Wrestling Council
 WWC North American Heavyweight Championship (1 time)
 World Wrestling Federation / Entertainment 
WWF Intercontinental Championship (1 time)
 WWF World Heavyweight Championship (2 times)
 King of the Ring (1987)
 WWF World Heavyweight Championship Tournament (1988)
 WWE Hall of Fame (Class of 2015)
 Wrestling Observer Newsletter
 Match of the Year (1987) 
 Most Unimproved (1992)
 Worst Worked Match of the Year (1996) 
 Wrestling Observer Newsletter Hall of Fame (Class of 1996)

See also 
 "The Match Made in Heaven"

References

External links 

 
 

 

|-

|-

|-

|-

|-

1952 births
2011 deaths
20th-century professional wrestlers
21st-century professional wrestlers
American color commentators
American male film actors
American male professional wrestlers
American male voice actors
American people of Belarusian-Jewish descent
American people of Lithuanian-Jewish descent
American professional wrestlers of Italian descent
American Roman Catholics
AWA International Heavyweight Champions
Deaths from heart disease
Gulf Coast Cardinals players
New World Order (professional wrestling) members
People from Downers Grove, Illinois
Professional wrestlers from Ohio
Professional wrestling announcers
Professional Wrestling Hall of Fame and Museum
Sportspeople from Columbus, Ohio
Sportspeople from Sarasota, Florida
Sportspeople from Staten Island
Tampa Tarpons (1957–1987) players
The First Family (professional wrestling) members
USWA Unified World Heavyweight Champions
WCW World Heavyweight Champions
WWE Champions
WWE Hall of Fame inductees
WWF/WWE Intercontinental Champions
WWF/WWE King Crown's Champions/King of the Ring winners